Stephen Lawrence Blateric (born March 20, 1944) is a retired professional baseball player who played three seasons for the Cincinnati Reds, New York Yankees, and California Angels of Major League Baseball.

Blateric attended Lincoln High School and played college baseball at the University of Denver. He was signed as an undrafted free agent by the Boston Red Sox in 1966.

External links

1944 births
Living people
Major League Baseball pitchers
Baseball players from Colorado
Cincinnati Reds players
New York Yankees players
California Angels players
Indianapolis Indians players
Sioux City Packers players
Waterloo Hawks (baseball) players
Winston-Salem Red Sox players
Covington Red Sox players
Asheville Tourists players
Trois-Rivières Aigles players
Salt Lake City Gulls players
Iowa Oaks players
Oklahoma City 89ers players
Denver Bears players
Salt Lake City Angels players
Denver Pioneers baseball players